Bloomfield, also known as Holly Knoll, is a historic home located near Herndon, Fairfax County, Virginia.  It was built about 1858, and is a two-story, five bay, red brick I-house with a two-story service wing. The front facade has small one-story front portico with a flat roof is supported by four plain square posts.  The house has Federal / Greek Revival-style details.

It was listed on the National Register of Historic Places in 2013.

References

Houses on the National Register of Historic Places in Virginia
Federal architecture in Virginia
Greek Revival houses in Virginia
Houses completed in 1858
Houses in Fairfax County, Virginia
National Register of Historic Places in Fairfax County, Virginia